In ten-pin bowling, a Dutch 200 is a game in which the bowler records a score of 200 by getting strikes and spares in alternation throughout the game. Strikes, when thrown in the even-numbered frames, require six spares (strike then spare in the 10th frame). For strikes in the odd-numbered frames, five spares are needed, with a strike on the last shot of the game. When bowled in certified play, the certifying body may issue a patch or other award commemorating the feat. 

The term is thought to originate from the phrase "Dutch treat" which is when two individuals share the cost of a date.

Traditionally, a Dutch 200 is one of the hardest games to bowl due to the alternation of the spares and strikes which gives each frame a score of 20. Note that there are over 1.5 billion other ways to bowl an exact 200 game without using either method (which totals just 1.1 million combinations).

Related oddity

Though unawarded, if a bowler can repeat the sequence of strike, strike, nine (first ball), missed spare for a full game (there is no spare attempt in the 10th frame), the score will also be 200. For the first nine frames, the bowler will score 57 (29 + 19 + 9) every three frames, for 171, with 29 more in the 10th frame to total 200.

References

Ten-pin bowling